Scarcella is a surname of Italian origin. Notable people with the surname include:

 Ilaria Scarcella (born 1993), Italian swimmer
 Louis N. Scarcella (born 1951/1952), American police detective
 Pietro Scarcella (born 1950), Italian-Canadian mobster
 Sebastiano Scarcella (born 1925), Italian rector and jurist

See also
 Scarsella

Italian-language surnames